Matějovský is a Czech surname. Notable people with the surname include:
 
 Marek Matějovský (born 1981), Czech footballer
 Michal Matějovský (born 1985), Czech auto racer
 Radek Matějovský (born 1977), Czech ice hockey player

Czech-language surnames